USS Augusta (SSN-710), a , was the first ship of the United States Navy to be named for Augusta, Maine. The contract to build her was awarded to the Electric Boat Division of General Dynamics Corporation in Groton, Connecticut on 31 October 1973 and her keel was laid down on 1 April 1983. She was launched on 21 January 1984 sponsored by Mrs. Diana D. Cohen, wife of U.S. Senator William Cohen and commissioned on 19 January 1985.

1986 collision 
The Department of Defense reported that Augusta required $2.7 million worth of repairs due to damage in an undersea collision while on a routine training patrol.  On 31 October 1986 Augusta entered dry-dock at Electric Boat to have her sonar dome replaced and the repairs were completed on 13 December 1986.

The Soviet Navy claims that on 3 October 1986, Augusta collided with the 667AU Nalim (Yankee-I) class ballistic missile submarine K-219, commanded by Igor Britanov, off the coast of Bermuda. The U.S. Navy states that K-219 was disabled by an internal explosion.

CBS news reported that Augusta "very possibly" collided with a Soviet submarine.

Later service 
In July 1987, Augusta began service as a trials boat for the BQG-5D Wide Aperture Array (WAA) passive sonar system and carrying the prototype BQQ-10 ARCI sonars, which incorporate off-the-shelf computer components, allowing easy introduction of modular upgrades.

In 2003, Augusta was part of a small group of submarines participating in Tomahawk Strikes against Iraq in the opening of Operation Iraqi Freedom. The boat successfully launched missiles against all assigned missions leaving the theater with 100% completion.

Augusta underwent extensive maintenance during 2006 to prepare for six-month deployment in 2007, which began in March and completed in September. Augusta changed her homeport to Norfolk Naval Shipyard, where she began decommissioning in January 2008, and completed the disassembly of her reactor on 24 November 2008.

References

External links 

USS Augusta SSN-710 Official Alumni Association
USS Augusta SSN 710 Alumni News Blog
 

Ships built in Groton, Connecticut
Los Angeles-class submarines
Cold War submarines of the United States
United States submarine accidents
Maritime incidents in 1986
Augusta, Maine
Nuclear submarines of the United States Navy
1984 ships